The 1973 Calgary Stampeders finished in 4th place in the Western Conference with a 6–10 record and failed to make the playoffs.

Regular season

Season Standings

Season schedule

Awards and records

1973 CFL All-Stars
DE – John Helton, CFL All-Star

References

Calgary Stampeders seasons
1973 Canadian Football League season by team